Joseph Pasquale Crazzolara (12 April 1884  – 25 March 1976) was a Christian missionary in Africa, an ethnologist and a linguist.

Works
Outlines of a Nuer Grammar (1933)
A Study of the Acooli Language (1938)
The Lwoo (1950–54)
Zur Gesellschaft und Religion der Nueer (1953)
A Study of the Logbara (Ma'di) Language (1960)
A Study of the Pokot (Suk) Language (1978)

Bibliography
 

1884 births
1976 deaths
Christian missionaries in Africa
Linguists from Italy
Italian ethnologists
Missionary linguists
Italian Christian missionaries
20th-century linguists